Narelle Kheng (born 24 September 1993) is a Singaporean singer, actress, and former national swimmer. She made her debut in the Singaporean band The Sam Willows in 2012.

Personal life
Kheng was a national youth swimmer, having trained at the Singapore Sports School since the age of six.

She was educated at Methodist Girls' School, Anglo-Chinese Junior College and Singapore Sports School, before graduating from the Nanyang Technological University, where she majored in communication studies.

Narelle is the younger sister of Benjamin Kheng.

Music career
Kheng is the bass guitarist and vocalist for The Sam Willows. After announcing their hiatus in May 2019, she has since pursued her solo career.

Narelle released her solo single “Outta My Head” on 4 April 2019. She released her debut EP “Part 2” on 10 October 2019, in conjunction with World Mental Health Day. On 26 March 2021, Narelle released "Complicated Love Song", which is part of the her three-song EP, "Part 3".

Acting career
Kheng had cameo roles in drama serials Zero Calling, Against The Tide and Peace & Prosperity. 

In 2014, she and her brother, Benjamin, starred in a Channel 5 show, Do It Yourself creating DIY furniture. 

In 2017, Kheng played the lead role, Cindy in the Toggle Original series Lifespam.

Filmography

Film

Television

Variety

Discography

Singles

References

External links

 at The Sam Willows Band

	
	

Living people
1993 births
Singaporean actresses
Singaporean jazz musicians
21st-century Singaporean women singers
Singaporean pop singers
Singaporean singer-songwriters
Singaporean Hokkien pop singers
Jazz guitarists
Jazz pianists
Jazz fusion musicians
Jazz bandleaders
Women jazz musicians
21st-century pianists
21st-century guitarists
21st-century Singaporean actresses
The Sam Willows members
21st-century women guitarists
21st-century women pianists